The 2019 Verrazzano Open was a professional tennis tournament played on clay courts. It was the second edition of the tournament which was part of the 2019 ATP Challenger Tour. It took place in Sophia Antipolis, France between 1 and 7 April 2019.

Singles main-draw entrants

Seeds

 1 Rankings are as of March 18, 2019.

Other entrants
The following players received wildcards into the singles main draw:
  Antoine Cornut Chauvinc
  Pierre-Hugues Herbert
  Lorenzo Musetti
  Arthur Rinderknech
  Tseng Chun-hsin

The following players received entry into the singles main draw using their ITF World Tennis Ranking:
  Baptiste Crepatte
  Peter Heller
  Karim-Mohamed Maamoun
  Oriol Roca Batalla

The following players received entry from the qualifying draw:
  Frederico Ferreira Silva
  Máté Valkusz

The following player received entry as a lucky loser:
  Alexander Zhurbin

Champions

Singles

 Dustin Brown def.  Filip Krajinović 6–3, 7–5.

Doubles

 Thiemo de Bakker /  Robin Haase def.  Enzo Couacaud /  Tristan Lamasine 6–4, 6–4.

References

2019 ATP Challenger Tour
2019 in French tennis
April 2019 sports events in France